The Anglican Diocese of the Western Gulf Coast is a diocese of the Anglican Church in North America, comprising 15 parishes, 10 in Texas and 5 in Louisiana.

The movement to start a new diocese of the ACNA in the states of Texas and Louisiana begun in 2011. In June 2012, the Anglican Diocese of the Western Gulf Coast was officially approved as a diocese-in-formation at the ACNA General Assembly.

On April 20, 2013, Clark W. P. Lowenfield was consecrated as the first bishop of the new diocese-in-formation in The Woodlands, Texas, by the Most Rev. Robert Duncan. The Anglican Diocese of the Western Gulf Coast was admitted as a full member diocese at the ACNA General Assembly in June 2013.

References

External links
Anglican Diocese of the Western Gulf Coast Official Website

Dioceses of the Anglican Church in North America
Anglican realignment dioceses
Anglican dioceses established in the 21st century